A list of films produced in the Soviet Union in 1941 (see 1941 in film).

1941

See also
1941 in the Soviet Union

External links
 Soviet films of 1941 at the Internet Movie Database

1941
Soviet
Films